The Burgman series of scooters (known in Japan as Skywave) is produced by Suzuki with engine capacities from 125 cc up to 638 cc.

AN series
Launched in 1998, the original model line-up consisted of the AN250 and AN400Y models. In 2002 the AN250 was dropped, replaced by the European-legislation compliant for learner-license purposes UH125. However, the AN250 continued to be released in other countries. The UH prefix was used on this model due to a current model of non Burgman heritage still being produced.  This is the AN125 and bears no resemblance nor lineage with the Burgman series.

AN2 series
In 2002, the fuel injected AN2 series was launched in UH125, AN400 and AN650 (L2) variants. With a redesigned fairing package allowing for better lighting, more storage capacity and 1litre more fuel capacity, there was also the option for ABS on the AN400 and AN650 models. The AN400 was available in USA markets in 2002 and the following year the AN650 (L3) came to USA. Changes to the eCVT and computer on the AN650 (L5) in 2005. 

In 2004, Suzuki launched an up-market AN650A Executive (Non-USA), which involved a full ABS and accessories package. 

Burgman 400 had a few models

2005-2006? Burgman 400S became available, featured chrome handle bars, a lower sport like bike windshield, and white and red gauges

in 2007 the 400 was updated from a 13" to a 14" front wheel, dual disc brakes in the front

In 2018 the Burgman 400 was totally redesigned

Models

UH125 Burgman 125 (2002-present) - often mistakenly identified as AN125 (an earlier Suzuki model which shares none of the Burgman traits).  Whereas a Burgman UH125 is classed as a maxi-scooter, AN125 is a scooter. Suzuki Burgman is one of the fastest motorbikes regarding 125 cc and is quite comfortable.
UB125 Burgman Street 125 (2018-present) - a Burgman maxi-scooter family built in India based on Suzuki Access, completely different and smaller than UH125. There is also a variant named Burgman Street 125EX, which has a 12-inch tubeless tire in the rear and was introduced in 2022.
UH150 Burgman 150 (2002-2006)
UH200 Burgman 200 (2007-present)
AN250 Burgman 250 (1998-2017)
AN400 Burgman 400 (1999-present)
AN400 Burgman 400 ABS
AN650 Burgman 650 (2002-2018)
AN650A Burgman 650 Executive - this package typically adds ABS (Antilock Braking System), an electric adjustable windshield, electric adjustable folding mirrors, passenger backrest, chrome bar ends and chrome muffler cover. In Canada and Europe, heated hand grips and heated seats are also part of the Executive package.

Experimentals and limited editions
Suzuki has made a hydrogen fuel cell-electric hybrid scooter called the Suzuki Burgman fuel cell scooter. It received "whole vehicle type" approval in the EU.

References

External links

SUZUKI BURGMAN 400 (AN400)

Burgman
Maxi scooters
Motorcycles introduced in 1999